Usmon Qudratovich Toshev is an Uzbekistani professional football coach and former player. From November 2018 he is the head coach of the Bukhara.

Career

Club
He played for the youth team of the Bukhara "Yoshkuch". From 1985 to 1987, he played for the "Zarafshan". In 1987 he graduated from Bukhara University with a degree in sports education. In 1988, he played for the "Pakhtakor". In 1989–1991, he played for the Bukhara "Nurafshon".

In 1992, he played for the Russian "Atommash" from Volgodonsk. In the same year, he also played again for "Nurafshon". In 1992–1993 he played for the Hungarian club "Szolnok". In 1994–1998 he was a player in the "Bukhara" club. In 1998, he also played for the Greek club "Keratsini". In 1999 he completed his playing career at "Bukhara".

International
In 1994 he played two matches for the national team of Uzbekistan, in matches against teams of Tajikistan and Kyrgyzstan.

Managerial
After completing his career as a footballer, in 2000 he was appointed head coach of the "Bukhara", which he headed until 2008. Under the leadership of Toshev, "Bukhara" was one of the "middle peasants" in the Highest League of Uzbekistan. In 2002, in parallel, he was the head coach of the national team of the Bukhara Region in football in the national student games “Universiade 2002”, which took place in Bukhara, and in which the national team of the Bukhara region became the champion.

In 2005 he received a coaching license PRO. In 2006, he worked for a while at the coaching staff of the national team of Uzbekistan under the leadership of Russian coach Valery Nepomnyashchy. In 2008 he was temporarily the head coach of the "Nasaf". In 2009, he headed the "Shurtan".

In 2009–2011 he was the head coach of the "Spartak Tashkent". In 2011, he worked as a manager and sports director at "Nasaf", and from May to November 2012 he headed this club. In 2013, he headed the "Spartak Bukhara".

In 2014–2015, he was the head coach of the Afghan club De Maiwand Atalan, which participates in the Afghan Premier League. In 2017, he headed the "Andijan" club, which then participated in the First League of Uzbekistan, and at the end of the season, took 3rd place in this league.

In 2018, for some time he headed the junior national team of Uzbekistan under 16 years old, with which he won the youth tournament of the CAFA. In the second half of 2018, he headed the Afghan club Tufan Herirud, with which he won the Afghan Premier League 2018.

Tajikistan
On 15 November 2018, Toshev was appointed as manager of the Tajikistan national under-23 football team, and several days later, in parallel, he was appointed as the head coach of Tajikistan. On June 18, 2021 Toshev resigned as Tajikistan National Football coach

Career statistics

International

Statistics accurate as of matches played in 1994

Managerial statistics

References

External links
 Usmon Toshev at footballfacts.ru

1965 births
Living people
People from Bukhara
Soviet footballers
Uzbekistani football managers
Uzbekistani footballers
Uzbekistan international footballers
Uzbekistani expatriate footballers
Expatriate footballers in Russia
Expatriate footballers in Hungary
Expatriate footballers in Greece
Uzbekistani expatriate sportspeople in Russia
Uzbekistani expatriate sportspeople in Greece
Pakhtakor Tashkent FK players
Association football midfielders
Tajikistan national football team managers